Nogalesen (YTB–777) was a United States Navy  named for Nogales, Arizona.

Construction

The contract for Nogalesen was awarded 31 January 1964. She was laid down on 12 August 1964 at Marinette, Wisconsin., by Marinette Marine and launched 24 June 1965.

Operational history

Upon completion late in July 1965, Nogalesen left the Great Lakes via the St. Lawrence Seaway for delivery to the Navy at Pearl Harbor. Placed in service 22 October she soon steamed for duty in the western Pacific. Equipped with firefighting equipment and designed to work alongside every ship in the fleet, Nogalesen assisted the Pacific Fleet from her homeport at Naval Station, Guam.

Stricked from the Navy List 13 March 2001, Nogalesen was disposed of in support of a fleet training exercise, 26 April 2003.

Notes

References

External links
 

 

Natick-class large harbor tugs
Ships built by Marinette Marine
1965 ships